Lovari ("horse-dealer", from Hungarian "ló", horse) is a subgroup of the Romani people, who speak their own dialect, influenced by Hungarian and West Slavic dialects. They live predominantly throughout Central Europe (Hungary, Poland, Slovakia, the Czech Republic, and Germany) as well as in Southeastern Europe (Romania, Croatia, and northern Serbia).

Ethnology
The Lovari are a Romani people who speak a dialect influenced by Hungarian and West Slavic dialects. Their language is classified under Vlax Romani. The Lovari are further divided into the Machvaya, named after the Mačva region, which they settled from modern day Hungary.

Employment
Historically, their trade is horse-trading and fortune-telling.

Customs
Lovari's traditional costume is based on traditional Central European Romani national costumes and is seldom used nowadays. They also have very strict contamination customs.

Diaspora
Tucson, Arizona and Hamilton, Ontario house large numbers of Machvaya. They can be found living in countries including the United States, Canada, Brazil and the United Kingdom.

See also
 Kalderash
 Ruska Roma

References

Bibliography
Yoors Jan. The Gypsies. New York. 1983.

External links
Ethnologue: Romani
Lovari in Croatia

 
Romani groups
Romani in Ukraine
Romani in Serbia